Statistics of Turkish First Football League in season 1986/1987.

Overview
Nineteen clubs participated, and Galatasaray S.K. won the championship.

League table

Results

References
Turkey - List of final tables (RSSSF)

Süper Lig seasons
1986–87 in Turkish football
Turkey